Lamzoudo is a town in the Doulougou Department of Bazèga Province in central Burkina Faso. The town has a population of 1,707.

References

Populated places in the Centre-Sud Region
Bazèga Province